Shakur is a surname and rarely used as a name like Shakir. Also, it is from one of the names of God in Islam, Ash-Shakur. Notable people with the name include:

Surname
 'Abd Allah II ibn 'Ali 'Abd ash-Shakur (died 1930), Ethiopia emir
 Afeni Shakur (1947–2016), American activist
 Assata Shakur (born 1947), American activist and convict
 Mopreme Shakur (born 1969), American rapper
 Muhammad ibn 'Ali 'Abd ash-Shakur, Ethiopian emir
 Mustafa Shakur (born 1984), American basketball player
 Mutulu Shakur (born 1950), Black Liberation Army leader
 Sanyika Shakur (1963–2021), Los Angeles gang member
 Tupac Shakur (1971–1996), American rapper and actor

Given name
Shakur Brown (born 1999), American football player
Shakur Stevenson (born 1997), American professional boxer

See also
Shakir